Cryptoblepharus pannosus, also known commonly as the ragged snake-eyed skink, is a species of lizard in the family Scincidae. The species is endemic to Australia.

Geographic range
Within Australia, C. pannosus is found in New South Wales, Northern Territory, Queensland, South Australia, Victoria and the Australian Capital Territory.

Habitat
C. pannosus are very agile climbers, and because of this they are mainly arboreal and extremely versatile, they can be found living under rocks and logs. C. pannosus can also live in or under human structures, including fences and walls throughout Eastern Australia. C. pannosus also occur in a variety of habitats, including forest, shrubland, and grassland.

Description
C. pannosus has a longitudinally-aligned pattern, with usually 5 supraciliary scales, pale, acute plantar scales, strongly keeled sub digital lamellae, 43-56 (modally 48) paravertebral scales, and relatively short limbs.
Brown, grey to blackish with variable, complex ragged pattern including broad dark vertebral zone 3-4 scales wide, dark flecks aligning to form 2 narrow broken dorsal stripes and ragged, broad pale grey to cream laterdorsal stripes.
C. pannosus is able to drop its tail when threatened and can regrow it in 6-12 months.

Reproduction
C. pannosus is oviparous, and breeding is year round.
Males mature at approximately 30.0 mm snout-vent length and females at 30.4 mm.

References

Further reading
Cogger HG (2014). Reptiles and Amphibians of Australia, Seventh Edition. Clayton, Victoria, Australia: CSIRO Publishing. xxx + 1,033 pp. .
Horner P (2007). "Systematics of the snake-eyed skinks, Cryptoblepharus Wiegmann (Reptilia: Squamata: Scincidae) – an Australian-based review". The Beagle Supplement 3: 21–198. (Cryptoblepharus pannosus, new species).
Wilson, Steve; Swan, Gerry (2013). A Complete Guide to Reptiles of Australia, Fourth Edition. Sydney: New Holland Publishers. 248-249 pp. .

Cryptoblepharus
Skinks of Australia
Endemic fauna of Australia
Reptiles described in 2007
Taxa named by Paul Horner (herpetologist)